Stronach is a surname. Notable people with the surname include:

 Adam Stronach, English Christian missionary
 Alexander Stronach, English Protestant Christian missionary
 Ancell Stronach (1901–1981), Scottish artist
 Belinda Stronach (born 1966), Canadian politician and businessperson, daughter of Frank 
 David Stronach (born 1931), Scottish archeologist of ancient Iran and Iraq
 Frank Stronach (born 1932), Austrian and Canadian businessman and politician
Stronach Group, a gambling and horse racing company in North America
 Stronach Stables, a North American Thoroughbred horse racing arm 
 Team Stronach, a defunct political party in Austria
 George Stronach (1912–1999), British Merchant Navy officer
 Gordon Stronach (1908–1968), Canadian politician
 Henry Stronach (1865–1932), New Zealand cricketer
 John Stronach (1810–1888), English Protestant Christian missionary, brother of Alexander
 Peter Stronach (born 1956), English football winger
 Tami Stronach (born 1972), American dancer and choreographer